= Dwi Candra Rukmana =

Indonesian footballer

Dwi Chandra Rukmana
Personal information
- Full name: Dwi Chandra Rukmana
- Date of birth: August 21, 1997 (age 29)
- Place of birth: Semarang, Indonesia
- Height: 1.70 m (5 ft 7 in)
- Position: Striker

Youth career
- 2009–2012: SSB Pengcab Semarang
- 2013–2014: PSIS Junior

Senior career*
Years	Team	Apps	(Gls)
2016–2017	PSIS Semarang	10	(1)
2017–2018	PSMS Medan	12	(0)
2018–2019	Bhayangkara Muda	4	(0)
- * Club domestic league appearances and goals as of 3 June 2016

Dwi Chandra Rukmana (born 21 August 1997) is an Indonesian former footballer who plays as a striker.

== Career ==
=== PSIS Semarang ===
He first played professionally for PSIS Semarang in June 2016.
